Rose Moore Hinchey   (21 June 1910 – 4 August 1981) was a New Zealand civilian and military nurse.

Early life and education
Hinchey was born in Bluff, New Zealand, on 21 June 1910. She was the eldest of four children of William Hinchey and Henrietta Goetze (née Thompson). Her parents ran the Eagle Hotel and her father was also the mayor of Bluff. Hinchey attended Bluff School and Southland Girls' High School. She then trained as a nurse at Kew Hospital in Invercargill followed by midwifery training at Alexandra Hospital in Wellington.

Career
On completing her training, Hinchey nursed at a hospital in Bowen Street in Wellington. In 1936, she travelled to England and worked at an obstetric hospital alongside fellow Southland expatriate Charles Read. She was commissioned into the nursing branch of the British Army, Queen Alexandra's Royal Army Nursing Corps in 1937 and initially nursed at the Cambridge Aldershot Military Hospital for two years. In January 1939, she was posted to a military hospital in Bombay (present-day Mumbai), India. During World War II she served in a number of war zones, and after the war she served in India, the Middle East, Africa, Korea and Malaysia. She attained the rank of Major in 1949, which she held until her retirement in 1965. She settled in Wellington, New Zealand, and died there on 4 August 1981.

Awards and honours 
Hinchey's medals are displayed in the entrance hall of Southland Girls' High School, and include the Royal Red Cross and the United Nations Service Medal for Korea.

References

1910 births
1981 deaths
People from Bluff, New Zealand
People educated at Southland Girls' High School
Military nurses
World War II nurses
20th-century New Zealand people
Members of the Royal Red Cross
Queen Alexandra's Royal Army Nursing Corps officers